Albany High School may refer to:

In the United Kingdom 
 The former name of Albany Academy in Chorley, Lancashire, England

In the United States 
 Albany High School (California), Albany, California
 Albany High School (Georgia), Albany, Georgia
 Albany High School (Louisiana), Albany, Louisiana
 Albany High School (Minnesota), Albany, Minnesota
 Albany High School (New York), Albany, New York
 Albany High School (Texas), Albany, Texas
 Albany High School (Wisconsin), Albany, Wisconsin
 Albany High School (Alaska), Anchorage, Alaska
 Albany Union High School, the former name of West Albany High School in Albany, Oregon, prior to the completion of South Albany High School in 1972

See also
Albany Junior/Senior High School
Albany Senior High School (disambiguation)